The fifth season of the Dutch reality singing competition The Voice of Holland, created by media tycoon John de Mol, aired during 2014 on RTL4. Martijn Krabbé and Wendy van Dijk returned as co-hosts, while Jamai Loman replaced Winston Gerschtanowitz as host of the red room. Marco Borsato, Trijntje Oosterhuis, Ilse DeLange and Ali B returned as coaches.

One of the important premises of the show is the quality of the singing talent. Four coaches, themselves popular performing artists, train the talents in their group and occasionally perform with them. Talents are selected in blind auditions, where the coaches cannot see, but only hear the auditioner.

This season included future Eurovision winner Duncan Laurence, who competed under his real name, Duncan de Moor.

Coaches
For the first time in this show's history, all 4 coaches from Season 4 (Trijnte Oostherhuis, Marco Borsato, Ali B, and Ilse de Lange) have returned for season 5.

Teams
Color key

Blind auditions
A contestant pool of 150 was narrowed down to 58 artists during the blind audition. The first blind audition episode premiered on August 29, 2014 while the last blind audition episode showed on October 10, 2014. New this year, if an artist does not turn a chair, they must immediately exit the stage.
Color key

Episode 1 (August 29)

Episode 2 (September 5)

Episode 3 (September 12)

Episode 4 (September 19)

Episode 5 (September 26)

Episode 6 (October 3)

Episode 7 (October 10)

The Battle Rounds 
The battle rounds determine which candidates from each team move on to the live shows. Two (or three) contestants from within a team are paired together to sing the same song, and ultimately, only eight candidates per team advance to the live shows. Continuing from season 4, each coach is allowed to steal one contestant from another coach's team. New for this season is that the studio audience can vote on contestants (through their own mobile phones). They can vote for that contestant  (red vs. blue), thus helping influence the coach's decision on who moves on. Furthermore, since both Ilse and Ali B ended the blind auditions with 15 contestants each, 3 from each team were required to battle and one was taken through, while the others were then able to be stolen. 
Color key:

Live Shows

The Clashes
New this season are the Live Clash Rounds. In the first two live shows have 2 contestants (from the same team) sing 2 songs, going from one contestant to another and then repeating that process one more time. Each coach pairs two contestant to face. Immediately after The Clash gives points [out of 100] to each contestant (ex. 60/40). In the meantime, people can also give points [out of 100] to contestants through calls, text messages or votes via their smartphone or tablet from the free Red Room app during a voting window. All points are added up, and this determines which contestant is the winner of The Clash and continues to live show 3.

The Clashes 1 

Competition performances

The Clashes 2 

Competitor performances

Liveshow 3 

Competitor performances

Liveshow 4 

Competitor performances

Cross Battles/Semi Finals 
The semifinal is slightly different than the other live shows. In 'The Cross Battles', the coaches go into battle with contestants from other teams. By a draw, two contestants of different teams were paired. These two contestants competed against each other, but singing their own song. Viewers at home determined the winner of the cross battles. Four finalists were chosen, but the chances were high that a coach would not have a finalist for the final. This happened to Ilse Delange when her remaining two contestants were eliminated.
Competitor performances

Finalist performances
After the announcement of the finalists sang finalist his / her winner's single. Then people could download their favorite single by iTunes. During the week prior to the final, people can download their songs, which is worth one vote for that finalist.

These are the songs that the eliminated semi-finalists would have sung if they had been voted into the finale:
 April & Dr. Rum - "Bulletproof"
 Megan Brands - "There Is Love"
 Duncan de Moor - "Broken Promises"
 David Dam - "Grateful"

Finale 
Competitor performances

Non-competition performances

Result
After the competition performances, Emmaly was eliminated and then sang her single. Then viewers could vote for O'G3NE, Sjors and Guus. After 10 minutes, Guus was eliminated and then sang his single. Then finalists O'G3NE and Sjors sang their singles to win the final vote. Afterwards, O'G3NE was crowned the winner of The Voice of Holland 2014 while Sjors finished in 2nd place. With the win, O'G3NE became the first trio to win the competition on any international version of The Voice.

Elimination Chart

Overall
Color key
Artist's info

Result details

Team

Result details

References

External links
 The Voice of Holland Official website

The Voice of Holland
2014 Dutch television seasons